The Boston Blazers are a lacrosse team based in Boston playing in the National Lacrosse League (NLL). The 2011 season was their third and final season in the NLL. After acquiring both Casey Powell and Josh Sanderson in the off-season, the Blazers looked to dominate the NLL East. But the Blazers did not gel as much as they might have hoped, and finished 4th in the East with an 8-8 record.

Standings

Game log
Reference:

Playoffs

Game log
Reference:

Transactions

Trades

Entry draft
The 2010 NLL Entry Draft took place on September 8, 2010. The Blazers selected the following players:

Roster

See also
2011 NLL season

References

Boston
Boston Blazers seasons
2011 in sports in Massachusetts